Qarwa Urqu (Quechua qarwa pale, yellowish, golden, urqu mountain, "yellowish mountain", Hispanicized spelling Jarhua Orjo) is a mountain in the Chunta mountain range in the Andes of Peru, about  high. It lies in the Huancavelica Region, Huancavelica Province, Huancavelica District, northwest of Antarasu.

References

Mountains of Huancavelica Region
Mountains of Peru